In the architecture of a ship, a companion or companionway is a raised and windowed hatchway in the ship's deck, with a ladder leading below and the hooded entrance-hatch to the main cabins. A companionway may be secured by doors or, commonly in sailboats, hatch boards  which fit in grooves in the companionway frame. This allows the lowest board to be left in place during inclement weather to minimize water infiltration. The term may be more broadly used to describe any ladder between decks.

See also
 Glossary of nautical terms

References

Rooms
Water transport
Nautical terminology